VA246 may refer to:
 Ariane flight VA246, an Ariane 5 launch that occurred on 4 December 2018
 Virgin Australia flight 246, with IATA flight number VA246
 Virginia State Route 246 (VA-246), a primary state highway in the United States